Download Series Volume 1 is the first in a series of digital download albums by the rock band the Grateful Dead. It was released on May 3, 2005. The album features the complete show from April 30, 1977, which was the second of a five night run at New York City's Palladium. In addition, in order to fill out the third disc, bonus material is included from the previous night at the same location.

Volume 1 was mastered in HDCD from original 2-track soundboard tapes by Jeffrey Norman. Like others in the Download Series the music is available for download as 128Kbit or 256Kbit MP3s or lossless FLAC-files, all without any
copy-protection.

Critical reception

On AllMusic, Jesse Jarnow said, "Rivaling the spring of 1972 as the most-plundered season in the Grateful Dead's live catalog, the spring of 1977 found the Dead playing at their platonic best. It was during that period that the Dead struck what, for many, remains the perfect balance of tightness and energy of performance... The band's April 30th show at the Palladium – the first release in their downloads series, and the sixth extended release from the spring of 1977, including one box set – has an advantage on the much revered show recorded in Ithaca on May 8th: an actual open-ended jam. A 15-minute "Not Fade Away" veers into deep, melodic abstraction before languidly seguing into Garcia's heart-wrenching ballad "Stella Blue"."

Track listing

Disc one
First set:
"The Music Never Stopped" (John Perry Barlow, Bob Weir) - 7:05
"Bertha" (Robert Hunter, Jerry Garcia) - 6:19
"It's All Over Now" (Bobby Womack) - 8:04
"Deal" (Hunter, Garcia) - 6:11
"Mama Tried" > (Merle Haggard) - 2:38
"Me and My Uncle" (John Phillips) - 3:04
"Peggy-O" (trad., arr. Grateful Dead) - 7:46
"Looks Like Rain" (Barlow, Weir) - 9:39
"Mississippi Half Step Uptown Toodeloo" (Hunter, Garcia) - 10:06
"Promised Land" (Chuck Berry) - 4:53

Disc two
Second set:
"Scarlet Begonias" > (Hunter, Garcia) - 9:05
"Fire On The Mountain" > (Hunter, Mickey Hart) - 11:27
"Good Lovin'" (Rudy Clark, Artie Resnick) - 5:47
"Friend Of The Devil" (John Dawson, Hunter, Garcia) - 8:42
"Estimated Prophet" (Barlow, Weir) - 9:01

Disc three
"St. Stephen" > (Hunter, Garcia, Phil Lesh) - 4:34
"Not Fade Away" > (Buddy Holly, Norman Petty) - 14:57
"Stella Blue" > (Hunter, Garcia) - 9:09
"St. Stephen" > (Hunter, Garcia, Lesh) - 0:49
"One More Saturday Night" (Weir) - 5:33
 Encore: "Terrapin Station" (Hunter, Garcia) - 10:20
"Sugaree" (Hunter, Garcia) - 14:18
"Scarlet Begonias" > (Hunter, Garcia) - 9:45
"Goin' Down The Road Feeling Bad" (trad., arr. Grateful Dead) - 10:17
7 - 9 are bonus tracks from 4/29/77

Personnel
Grateful Dead
 Jerry Garcia – lead guitar, vocals
 Donna Jean Godchaux – vocals
 Keith Godchaux – keyboards
 Mickey Hart – drums
 Bill Kreutzmann – drums
 Phil Lesh – electric bass
 Bob Weir – rhythm guitar, vocals

Production
 Betty Cantor-Jackson – recording
 Jeffrey Norman – mastering

References

External links
 Volume 1 at Dead.net

01
2005 live albums